The 1998–99 Russian Superleague season was the third season of the Russian Superleague, the top level of ice hockey in Russia. 22 teams participated in the league, and Metallurg Magnitogorsk won the championship.

Regular season

Playoffs

Relegation

External links
Season on hockeyarchives.ru

Russian Superleague seasons
1998–99 in Russian ice hockey leagues